Giacomo Giretto, born  in Imperia, Liguria is an Italian volleyball player, who earned a total number of 85 caps for the Men's National Team. He was on the side that won the title at the 1994 World Championships in Greece.

References
 Profile

1973 births
Living people
People from Imperia
Italian men's volleyball players
Universiade medalists in volleyball
Universiade bronze medalists for Italy
Medalists at the 1995 Summer Universiade
Sportspeople from the Province of Imperia